All Our Desires is a 2011 French drama film directed by Philippe Lioret. Marie Gillain was nominated for the Magritte Award for Best Actress for her role. The screenplay was adapted loosely from the 2009 French non-fiction book Other Lives But Mine.

Synopsis 
In Lyon, Claire (Marie Gillain) is a young magistrate confronted with people in debt, in particular with a young woman, Céline (Amandine Dewasmes), whom she tries to help. During a hospital examination, Claire learns that she has an incurable brain tumor (glioblastoma) and that she has little time to live. At the same time, she meets Stéphane (Vincent Lindon), a more experienced colleague, and together they seek a legal loophole against the credit agencies.

Cast
 Vincent Lindon as Stéphane
 Marie Gillain as Claire Conti
 Amandine Dewasmes as Céline
 Yannick Renier as Christophe (as Yannick Rénier)
 Pascale Arbillot as Marthe
 Laure Duthilleul as Carole
 Isabelle Renauld as Doctor Hadji
 Emmanuel Courcol as Doctor Stroesser
 Eric Godon as Gallois

Accolades

References

External links
 

2011 films
2011 drama films
2010s French-language films
French drama films
Films directed by Philippe Lioret
Films about cancer
Films based on biographies
2010s French films